March On may refer to:

Songs
"March On!", song of the British Blue Shirts 1931, lyrics by Commander Oliver Locker-Lampson, music from the 1929 film High Treason
March On! (You Fighting Sycamores), official school fight song of Indiana State University.  1939
"March On", song by Safura from It's My War 
"March On, Bahamaland", the national anthem of the Bahamas

Other
March On (organization), 501(c)(4) organization in the United States that grew out of the 2017 Women's March
March On! The Day My Brother Martin Changed the World, the 2009 winner of the Carnegie Medal for Excellence in Children's Video